The Great Labor Day Hurricane of 1935  was the most intense Atlantic hurricane to make landfall on record by pressure, with winds of up to . The fourth tropical cyclone, third tropical storm, second hurricane, and second major hurricane of the 1935 Atlantic hurricane season, the Labor Day hurricane was one of four Category 5 hurricanes on record to strike the contiguous United States, along with Hurricane Andrew in 1992, Hurricane Camille in 1969, and Hurricane Michael in 2018. In addition, it was the third most intense Atlantic hurricane on record in terms of barometric pressure, only behind Hurricane Gilbert in 1988 and Hurricane Wilma in 2005.

The hurricane intensified rapidly, passing near Long Key on the evening of Monday, September 2. The region was swept by a massive storm surge as the eye passed over the area. The waters quickly receded after carving new channels connecting the bay with the ocean; however, gale-force winds and rough seas persisted into Tuesday, disrupting rescue efforts. The storm continued northwestward along the Florida west coast, weakening before making its second landfall near Cedar Key, Florida, on September 4.

The compact and intense hurricane caused catastrophic damage in the upper Florida Keys, as a storm surge of approximately  swept over the low-lying islands. The hurricane's strong winds and the surge destroyed nearly all the structures between Tavernier and Marathon. The town of Islamorada was obliterated. Portions of the Key West Extension of the Florida East Coast Railway were severely damaged or destroyed. In addition, many veterans died in work camps created for the construction of the Overseas Highway, in part due to poor working conditions. The hurricane also caused more damage in northwest Florida, Georgia, and the Carolinas.

Meteorological history

An area of disturbed weather developed northeast of the Turks Islands toward the end of August. By August 31, a definite tropical depression appeared near Long Island in the southeastern Bahamas and quickly intensified. It reached hurricane intensity near the south end of Andros Island on September 1. The storm then explosively intensified and turned toward the Florida Keys at a speed of 10 mph. After leaving the Keys, the storm weakened as it skirted the Florida gulf coast, making a second landfall at Cedar Keys. The storm sped up and rapidly weakened over the Mid-Atlantic states, causing heavy rainfall, with the highest total being  in Easton, Maryland. The storm finally emerged over the open Atlantic near Cape Henry. The storm continued into the North Atlantic Ocean, where it merged with an extratropical cyclone on September 10.

The first recorded instance of an aircraft flown for the specific purpose of locating a hurricane occurred on the afternoon of September 2, 1935. The Weather Bureau's 1:30 PM advisory placed the center of the hurricane at north latitude 23° 20', west longitude 80° 15', moving slowly westward. Captain Leonard Povey of the Aviation Corps of the Cuban Army (Cuerpo de Aviación del Ejército de Cuba) volunteered to investigate the threat to the capital. Flying a Curtis Hawk II, Captain Povey, an American expatriate, who was the Aviation Corps' chief training officer, observed the storm north of its reported position. Because he was flying an open-cockpit biplane, he opted not to fly into the storm. He later proposed an aerial hurricane patrol. Nothing further came of this idea until June 1943, when Colonel Joe Duckworth and Lieutenant Ralph O'Hair flew into a hurricane near Galveston, Texas.

Records

Preparations
Northeast storm warnings were ordered displayed from Fort Pierce to Fort Myers in the September 1, 9:30 AM Weather Bureau advisory. Upon receipt of this advisory the U.S. Coast Guard Station, Miami, FL, sent a plane along the coast to advise boaters and campers of the impending danger by dropping message blocks. A second flight was made on Sunday afternoon. All planes were placed in the hangar and its door closed at 10:00 AM Monday. The 3:30 AM advisory, September 2 (Labor Day), predicted the disturbance "will probably pass through the Florida Straits Monday" and cautioned "against high tides and gales Florida Keys and ships in path." The 1:30 PM advisory ordered hurricane warnings for the Key West district which extended north to Key Largo. At around 2:00 PM, Fred Ghent, Assistant Administrator, Florida Emergency Relief Administration, requested a special train to evacuate the veterans work camps located in the upper keys. It departed Miami at 4:25 PM; delayed by a draw bridge opening, obstructions across the track, poor visibility and the necessity to back the locomotive below Homestead (so it could head out on the return trip) the train finally arrived at the Islamorada station on Upper Matecumbe Key at about 8:20 PM. This coincided with an abrupt wind shift from the northeast (Florida Bay) to southeast (Atlantic Ocean) and the arrival on the coast of the storm surge.

Impact

Three ships were reported to have run aground during the storm. The Danish motorship Leise Maersk was carried over and grounded nearly 4 miles away near Upper Matecumbe Key, although there was no loss of life. The engine room was flooded and the ship was disabled. The American tanker Pueblo lost control near  around 2 pm on September 2 and was pushed around the storm's center, ending up in Molasses Reef nearly eight hours later. The passenger steamship Dixie ran aground on French Reef. She was re-floated and towed to New York on September 19. No fatalities resulted from the incident.

On Upper Matecumbe Key, near Islamorada, an eleven-car evacuation train encountered a powerful storm surge topped by cresting waves. Eleven cars were swept from the tracks, leaving only the locomotive and tender upright and still on the rails. Remarkably, everyone on the train survived. The locomotive and tender were both barged back to Miami several months later.

The hurricane left a path of near-total destruction in the Upper Keys, centered on what is today the village of Islamorada. The eye of the storm passed a few miles to the southwest creating a calm of about 40 minutes duration over Lower Matecumbe and 55 minutes (9:20–10:15 PM) over Long Key. At Camp #3 on Lower Matecumbe the surge arrived near the end of the calm with the wind close behind. Nearly every structure was demolished, and some bridges and railway embankments were washed away. The links—rail, road, and ferry boats—that chained the islands together were broken. The main transportation route linking the Keys to mainland Florida had been a single railroad line, the Florida Overseas Railroad portion of the Florida East Coast Railway. The Islamorada area was devastated, although the hurricane's destructive path was narrower than most tropical cyclones. Its eye was eight miles (13 km.) across and the fiercest winds extended .) off the center, less than 1992's Hurricane Andrew, which was also a relatively small and catastrophic Category 5 hurricane. Craig Key, Long Key, and Upper Matecumbe and Lower Matecumbe Keys suffered the worst. The storm caused wind and flood damage along the Florida panhandle and into Georgia, and significant damage to the Tampa Bay Area. After the third day of the storm corpses swelled and split open in the subtropical heat, according to rescue workers. Public health officials ordered plain wood coffins holding the dead to be stacked and burned in several locations. The National Weather Service estimated 408 deaths from the hurricane. Bodies were recovered as far away as Flamingo and Cape Sable on the southwest tip of the Florida mainland.

The United States Coast Guard and other federal and state agencies organized evacuation and relief efforts. Boats and airplanes carried injured survivors to Miami. The railroad was never rebuilt, but temporary bridges and ferry landings were under construction as soon as materials arrived. On March 29, 1938, the last gap in the Overseas Highway linking Key West to the mainland was completed. The new highway incorporated the roadbed and surviving bridges of the railway.

The heavy rainfall in southern Georgian counties led to the spoilage of cotton. Attendant winds also ruined crops and inflicted minor damage to property. Property damage along the coastal regions of South Carolina amounted to $15,000, with the damage primarily occurring in the vicinity of Beaufort, Georgetown, and Walterboro. Damage to crops in South Carolina was also considerable, with high winds blowing down cotton, corn, sugar cane, and other unharvested crops. Windthrown trees also injured several people. Although winds had decreased over land by the time the storm reached the Mid-Atlantic states, the storm brought excessive rainfall that caused substantial damage to the region's crops. Corn suffered heavy losses in Virginia, contributing the bulk of the state's $1.65 million crop damage toll. Impacts from the storm in Maryland and Delaware were primarily concentrated in the southern portions of the two states; the cost of the damage amounted to around $2 million, including losses of $1 million in Caroline County, Maryland.

Aftermath

Response

Veterans' work camps

Three veterans' work camps existed in the Florida Keys before the hurricane: #1 on Windley Key, #3 and #5 on Lower Matecumbe Key. The camp payrolls for August 30 listed 695 veterans. They were employed in a project to complete the Overseas Highway connecting the mainland with Key West. The camps, including seven in Florida and four in South Carolina, were established by Harry L. Hopkins, director of the Federal Emergency Relief Administration (FERA). In the autumn of 1934 the problem of transient veterans in Washington, D.C. "threatened ... to become acute and did become acute in January." Facilities in the capital were inadequate to handle the large numbers of veterans seeking jobs. President Franklin D. Roosevelt met with Mr. Hopkins and Robert Fechner, director of the Civilian Conservation Corps (CCC) to discuss solutions. He "suggested the Southern camp plan and approved the program worked out by Mr. Hopkins for their establishment and maintenance." The VA identified eligible veterans. FERA offered grants to the states for their construction projects if they would accept the veterans as laborers. The state Emergency Relief Administrations were responsible for the daily management of the camps. In practice the state ERAs were very much the creatures of FERA,,to the extent of handpicking the administrators. That only two states participated was perhaps attributable to the then popular impression that the transient veterans were "diseased" bums and hoboes. It was a characterization enthusiastically fed by the media. In August 1935 both Time Magazine and The New York Times published sensational articles. On August 15, 1935, Hopkins announced the termination of the veterans work program and closure of all the camps.

On August 26 and 27, 1935, one of the veterans, Albert C. Keith, wrote letters to both the President and Eleanor Roosevelt urging that the camps not be closed. Keith was editor of the weekly camp paper, the Key Veteran News. He was emphatic that the veterans were being defamed and that their work program was a success story, rehabilitating many veterans for return to civilian life. The News published occasional reports from Camp #2, Mullet Key, St. Petersburg, Florida, at the entrance to Tampa Bay. This was the "colored" veterans camp; the Keys camps were white only. In early August the colored veterans were transferred to the new Camp #8 in Gainesville, Florida.

Rescue
Improved weather conditions on Wednesday, September 4, permitted the evacuation of survivors to begin. Participation of the rescue included American Red Cross, Florida National Guard, Federal Emergency Relief Administration (FERA), Works Progress Administration (WPA), Civilian Conservation Corps (CCC), United States Coast Guard, American Legion, Veterans of Foreign Wars, Dade County Undertakers Association, Dade County Medical Society, city and county officials, and numerous individuals, including Ernest Hemingway. Headquarters of the operation was the near shore of Snake Creek on Plantation Key. With the bridge over the creek washed out, this was the farthest point south on the highway. On September 5 at a meeting of all public and private agencies involved Governor David Sholtz placed the sheriffs of Monroe and Dade Counties in overall control.

On the evening of September 4, 1935, Brigadier General Frank T. Hines, VA Administrator, received a phone call from Hyde Park, New York. It was Stephen Early, the President's press secretary. He had orders from the President who was very distressed by the news from Florida. The VA was to: 1. Cooperate with FERA in seeing that everything possible be done for those injured in the hurricane; 2. See that the bodies were properly cared for shipment home to relatives, and that those bodies for which shipment home was not requested be sent to Arlington National Cemetery; and, 3. Conduct a very careful joint investigation with Mr. Hopkins' organization, to determine whether there was any fault that would lie against anyone in the Administration. Hines's representative in Florida was to take full charge of the situation and all other organizations and agencies were ordered to cooperate.

The President's first order was straightforward and promptly executed. 124 injured veterans were treated in Miami area hospitals; 9 of these died and 56 were later transferred to VA medical facilities.  Uninjured veterans were removed to Camp Foster in Jacksonville and evaluated for transfer to the CCC; those declining transfer or deemed unemployable were paid off and given tickets home. All of the FERA transient camps were closed in November 1935. In December 1935 FERA itself was absorbed within the new WPA, also directed by Hopkins.

Recovery
The second and third orders, however, were almost immediately compromised. At a news conference on September 5, Hopkins asserted that there was no negligence traceable to FERA in the failed evacuation of the camps as the Weather Bureau advisories had given insufficient warning. He also dispatched his assistant, Aubrey Willis Williams, to Florida to coordinate FERA efforts and to investigate the deaths. Williams and Hines' assistant, Colonel George E. Ijams, both arrived in Miami on September 6. Ijams concentrated on the dead, their collection, identification and proper disposition. This was to prove exceptionally difficult. Bodies were scattered throughout the Keys and their rapid decomposition created ghastly conditions. State and local health officials demanded a ban on all movement of bodies and their immediate burial or cremation in place; the next day Governor Sholtz so ordered. This was reluctantly agreed to by Hines with the understanding that those buried would be later disinterred and shipped home or to Arlington when permitted by the State health authorities.

The cremations began on Saturday, September 7; 38 bodies were burned together at the collection point beside Snake Creek. Over the next week 136 bodies were cremated on Upper Matecumbe Key at 12 different locations. On Lower Matecumbe Key 82 were burned at 20 sites. On numerous small keys in Florida Bay bodies were either burned or buried where found. This effort continued into November. 123 bodies had been transported to Miami before the embargo. These were processed at a temporary morgue staffed by fingerprint experts and 8 volunteer undertakers under tents at Woodlawn Park Cemetery (3260 SW 8th St, Miami). The intention was to identify the remains and prepare them for burial or further shipment. With the embargo in force, immediate burial of all the bodies at Woodlawn was mandatory. FERA purchased a plot in Section 2A. The VA coordinated the ceremony with full military honors on September 8. 109 bodies were buried in the FERA plot: 81 veterans, 9 civilians and 19 unidentified bodies. Some records claim 259 veterans were victims of the Hurricane:
47 civilians and 34 veterans cremated
61 civilians and 128 veterans {unknown} cremated
Total: 108 civilians and 162 veterans {cremated}

Of the rest:
42 civilians and 81 veterans known/buried
6 civilians and 9 veterans sent to relatives
7 civilians and 7 veterans unknown/buried
Total: 55 civilians and 97 veterans buried
Total: 163 civilians and 259 veterans =422

Although the Congressional Record  gives a report of 485 victims of the hurricane {257 veterans and 259 civilians} the Record also breaks down 694 World War I veterans by name and their status as:

Survived: 
443 number {437 living + 6 living, identification tentative}

Died:
251 broken down as:
2 listed as dead—dispositions of remains not listed
6 reburied in Hometowns
26 cremated
44 tentatively identified as dead
84 reburied in Woodlawn Cemetery, Miami
89 missing—believed dead 

The Florida Emergency Relief Administration reported that as of November 19, 1935, the total of dead stood at 423: 259 veterans and 164 civilians. These numbers are reflected on the Veterans Storm Relief Map (which see). By March 1, 1936, 62 additional bodies had been recovered bringing the total to 485: 257 veterans and 228 civilians. The discrepancy in veterans' deaths resulted from the difficulty in identifying bodies, particularly those found months after the hurricane, and a question of definition; whether to count just those on the camp payrolls or to include others, not enrolled, who happened to be veterans.

The Veterans' Affairs Administration (VA) compiled its own list of veterans' deaths: 
121 Dead-positive identification, 90 missing, and 45 dead-identification tentative - totaling 256. Five others are named in a footnote. One proved to be a misidentification of a previously listed veteran; two were state employees working at the camps; and two were unaffiliated veterans caught in the storm. This gives a total for all veterans of 260. Adding this to the Florida Emergency Relief Administration number for civilians gives a total of 488 for all deaths, 12 of the dead were listed as "colored".

Ernest Hemingway visited the veteran's camp by boat after weathering the hurricane at his home in Key West; he wrote about the devastation in a critical article titled "Who Killed the Vets?" for The New Masses magazine. Hemingway implied that the FERA workers and families, who were unfamiliar with the risks of Florida hurricane season, were unwitting victims of a system that appeared to lack concern for their welfare.

In the same issue of The New Masses appeared an editorial charging criminal negligence and a cartoon by Russell T. Limbach, captioned An Act of God, depicting burning corpses.

A The Washington Post editorial on Sept. 5, titled Ruin in the Veterans' Camps, stated the widely held opinion that the

camps were havens of rest designed to keep Bonus Marchers away from Washington ... Most of these veterans are drifters, psychopathic cases or habitual troublemakers  ... Those who are nor physically or mentally handicapped have no claim whatsoever to special rewards in return for bonus agitation.

Investigation

Meanwhile, Williams rushed to complete the investigation. He finished on Sunday, September 8, the day an elaborate memorial service and mass burial of hurricane victims (both coordinated by Ijams) were held in Miami. Ijams, who had been too busy to participate in the investigation and had not questioned any of the 12 witnesses interrogated by Williams, nonetheless signed the 15-page report to the President. That night Williams released it to the Miami press in a radio broadcast immediately following the memorial ceremony. Ijams considered the timing unfortunate after receiving several critical telephone messages. The report exonerated everyone involved and concluded: "To our mind the catastrophe must be characterized as an act of God and was by its very nature beyond the power of man or instruments at his disposal to foresee sufficiently far enough in advance to permit the taking of adequate precautions capable of preventing the death and desolation which occurred." Early also found the publicity around the report "unfortunate". In a telegram to his colleague, assistant Presidential secretary Marvin H. McIntyre, Early wrote that he had authorized Hines to proceed with a "complete and exhaustive" joint investigation with Hopkins. Significantly Hines was to "instruct his investigator that under no circumstances will any statement be made to the Press until final report has been submitted to the President." Hopkins gave similar instructions to his investigator. McIntyre also was involved in damage control. On Sept. 10, 1935, the Greater Miami Ministerial Association wrote the President an angry letter labeling the report a "whitewash". McIntyre forwarded it to FERA for a response. Williams returned a draft for the President's signature on Sept. 25th insisting the report was only preliminary and that the "final and detailed report   ... will be both thorough and searching".

Williams assigned John Abt, assistant general counsel for FERA, to complete the investigation. On Sept. 11, 1935, Hines directed the skeptical and meticulous David W. Kennamer to investigate the disaster. There was immediate friction between them; Kennamer believed Abt did not have an open mind and Abt felt further investigation was unnecessary. Working with Harry W. Farmer, another VA investigator, Kennamer completed his 2 volume report on October 30, 1935. Farmer added a third volume concerning the identification of the veterans. Kennamer's report included 2,168 pages of exhibits, 118 pages of findings, and a 19-page general comment. His findings differed substantially from those of Williams, citing three officials of the Florida Emergency Relief Administration as negligent (Administrator Conrad Van Hyning, Asst. Administrator Fred Ghent and Camp Superintendent Ray Sheldon). In a response to Abt's draft report to the President, Ijams sided with Kennamer. Hines and Hopkins never agreed on a final report, and Kennamer's findings were suppressed. They remained so for decades.

One might speculate that Hines wished to avoid a public quarrel with Hopkins, who had enjoyed Roosevelt's patronage since his term as New York Governor. Hines was a holdover from the Hoover administration. Such an internal dispute would embarrass the Roosevelt administration at the time a vote on the Adjusted Compensation Payment Act ("Bonus Bill") was upcoming (it passed on Jan. 27, 1936, over the President's veto). Also, 1936 was a presidential election year. Kennamer did appear at the House hearings in April 1936, along with Hines, Ijams, Williams and the 3 officials he pilloried in his report. He was not questioned about his controversial findings nor did he volunteer his opinions.

On November 1, 1935, the American Legion completed its own report on the hurricane. The Legion's National Commander, Ray Murphy, mailed a copy to President Roosevelt. It concluded that:

Williams prepared a response for the President stating: "A final report, based upon the facts obtained in this investigation [by the VA and FERA], will be submitted to me shortly. At that time I shall transmit a copy of the report to you for your information and consideration."

Memorials

Islamorada

Standing just east of U.S. 1 at mile marker 82 in Islamorada, near where Islamorada's post office stood, is a monument designed by the Florida Division of the Federal Art Project and constructed using Keys limestone ("keystone") by the Works Progress Administration. It was unveiled on November 14, 1937, with several hundred people attending. President Roosevelt sent a telegram to the dedication in which he expressed "heartfelt sympathy" and said, "the disaster which made desolate the hearts of so many of our people brought a personal sorrow to me because some years ago I knew many residents of the keys." The welcoming committee included Key West Mayor Willard M. Albury, and other local officials. Hines had been invited to speak but he declined. His attitude to the project was unenthusiastic. In a letter to Williams on June 24, 1937, regarding what to do with the many skeletons of veterans recently discovered in the Keys, he wrote: ″It occurs to me that if a large memorial is erected adjacent to this highway at the place of the disaster it will be observed by all persons using the highway and will serve as a constant reminder of the unfortunate catastrophe which occurred.″ Hines recommended the remains be buried at Woodlawn. A frieze depicts palm trees amid curling waves, fronds bent in the wind. In front of the sculpture a ceramic-tile mural of the Keys covers a stone crypt, which holds victims' ashes from the makeshift funeral pyres, commingled with the skeletons.

Although this is a gravesite, not a single name appears anywhere on the monument. This is not a requirement for the estimated 228 civilian dead, 55 of whom were buried where found or in various cemeteries. A memorial with identifying information is a statutory entitlement for the veterans. 170 were cremated or never identified. The VA has chosen not to memorialize them, despite current Federal law and President Roosevelt's order that Hines provides a burial with full military honors for every veteran not claimed by his family.

The memorial was added to the U.S. National Register of Historic Places on March 16, 1995. A Heritage Monument Trail plaque mounted on a coral boulder before the memorial reads:

The Florida Keys Memorial, known locally as the "Hurricane Monument," was built to honor hundreds of American veterans and local citizens who perished in the "Great Hurricane" on Labor Day, September 2, 1935. Islamorada sustained winds of 200 miles per hour and a barometer reading of 26.35 inches for many hours on that fateful holiday; most local buildings and the Florida East Coast Railway were destroyed by what remains the most savage hurricane on record. Hundreds of World War I veterans who had been camped in the Matecumbe area while working on the construction of U.S. Highway One for the Works Progress Administration (WPA) were killed. In 1937 the cremated remains of approximately 300 people were placed within the tiled crypt in front of the monument. The monument is composed of native keystone, and its striking frieze depicts coconut palm trees bending before the force of hurricane winds while the waters from an angry sea lap at the bottom of their trunks. Monument construction was funded by the WPA and regional veterans' associations. Over the years the Hurricane Monument has been cared for by local veterans, hurricane survivors, and descendants of the victims.

Local residents hold ceremonies at the monument every year on Labor Day (on the Monday holiday) and on Memorial Day to honor the veterans and the civilians who died in the hurricane.

Woodlawn Park Cemetery

On January 31, 1936, Harvey W. Seeds Post No. 29, American Legion, Miami, Florida, petitioned FERA for the deed to the Woodlawn plot. The Legion would use the empty grave sites for the burial of indigent veterans and accept responsibility for care of the plot. After some initial confusion as to the actual owner, the State of Florida approved the title transfer. A monument was placed on the plot, inscribed: Erected by Harvey W. Seeds Post No. 29, The American Legion, in Memory of Our Comrades Who Lost Their Lives on the Florida Keys during the 1935 Hurricane, Lest We Forget.
 
As with the Islamorada memorial, no names are listed, nor are the individual grave sites marked. The VA again chose not to obey the President's order, this time to rebury the unclaimed bodies at Arlington. Two bodies were, however, exhumed from Woodlawn cemetery by the families: Brady C. Lewis (on November 12, 1936), and Thomas K. Moore (on January 20, 1937), the latter of whom was reburied at Arlington. Five more received grave markers at Woodlawn, leaving 74 unmarked graves of identified veterans. Efforts are ongoing to mark all these graves.

One other veteran killed in the storm rests at Arlington, Daniel C. Main. His was a special case, the only veteran who died in the camps who was neither cremated in the Keys nor buried at Woodlawn. Main was the camp medical director and was killed in the collapse of the small hospital at Camp #1. His body was quickly recovered by survivors and shipped to his family before the embargo.

Veterans Key

On February 27, 2006, the U.S. Board on Geographic Names approved a proposal by Jerry Wilkinson, President, Historical Preservation Society of the Upper Keys, to name a small island off the southern tip of Lower Matecumbe Key for the veterans who died in the hurricane. It is near where Camp #3 was located. Veterans Key and several concrete pilings are all that remain of the 1935 bridge construction project.

Department of Veterans Affairs Actions

Government furnished grave markers are provided for eligible veterans buried in National Cemeteries, State veterans cemeteries and private cemeteries. Under VA regulations the applicant for a marker may only be the veteran's next of kin; so, too, for memorials when the body is not available for burial.  Prior to a 2009 revision, not enforced until 2012, any person with knowledge of the veteran could apply. The revision prompted objections from groups and volunteers working to mark the many unmarked veterans' graves, mostly from the Civil War era. They argued that the next-of-kin (if any) was often impossible to locate and that the very existence of an unmarked grave was evidence of the family's indifference. Two bills were introduced in Congress, H. R. 2018 and S. 2700 which would have again allowed unrelated applicants. Both bills died in committee. On October 1, 2014, the VA proposed a rule change which would include in the categories of applicants unrelated individuals.

In popular culture

Films and video games 
 In the 1948 Warner Brothers film Key Largo, Lionel Barrymore describes the horrors of the 1935 hurricane to an anxious Edward G. Robinson, as another hurricane bears down on the Florida Keys. Special effects were used on the Warner lot in the film to re-create a powerful hurricane.
 The 1997 documentary Hurricane '35: The Deadly Deluge, by Miles Associates Productions, includes interviews with survivors of the 1935 hurricane. Download available at 1935 Hurricane Documentary 27 min. video
 Nature's Fury: Storm of the Century, by Tower Productions, was a 2006 made-for-TV (History Channel) docudrama of the 1935 Hurricane.
 Neal Dorst talks to WPEC Channel 12 News in West Palm Beach about the 1935 Labor Day hurricane, Aug. 7, 2014.
 A Golden Wake, a point and click adventure video game, features main character Alfie Banks traveling down to the Florida Keys during the 1935 Labor Day hurricane to rescue George E. Merrick during the game's climax.

Novels and short stories
 
 
 
 Cleeton, Chanel (2020), The Last Train to Key West. Berkley. ASIN: B07YRW5VKW
Marjory Stoneman Douglas wrote the short story "September-Remember" soon after the hurricane. It appeared in the Saturday Evening Post; 12/7/1935, Vol. 208, Issue 23, p 12. It was anthologized in 1990:
 
The storm also features in novelist Craig McDonald's novel Toros & Torsos (2008, Bleak House Books), incorporating Ernest Hemingway.
 The Cypress House

See also

 List of Atlantic hurricanes
 List of Atlantic hurricane records
 List of Category 5 Atlantic hurricanes
 Hurricane Andrew (1992) – A devastating Category 5 hurricane that took a similar track
 Hurricane Irma (2017) – A destructive Category 5 hurricane that took a similar track
 Hurricane Ian (2022) – A devastating and destructive Category 4 Hurricane that is the deadliest hurricane to make landfall in Florida since this hurricane.
Other intense tropical cyclone landfalls
 1999 Odisha cyclone – the most intense recorded tropical cyclone in the North Indian Ocean
 Cyclone Winston (2016) –  the most intense modern tropical cyclone in the Southern Hemisphere on record, as well as the strongest to make landfall in the Southern Hemisphere
 Typhoon Yutu (2018) – the strongest typhoon ever recorded to impact the Mariana Islands
 Hurricane Dorian (2019) – Another Category 5 hurricane of an almost identical intensity that made landfall in the Bahamas on Labor Day
 Typhoon Goni (2020) – The strongest tropical cyclone to ever make landfall anywhere around the world with 195 mph winds.

References

Further reading

Histories
 
 
  Excerpt:The Florida Keys, 1935

Government publications
 United States. Congress. House. Committee on World War Veterans' Legislation. Florida Hurricane Disaster: Hearings Before the Committee On World War Veterans' Legislation, House of Representatives, Seventy-fourth Congress, Second Session, On H.R. 9486, a Bill for the Relief of Widows, Children And Dependent Parents of World War Veterans Who Died As the Result of the Florida Hurricane At Windley Island And Matecumbe Keys September 2, 1935   ... Washington DC: U.S. Govt. Printing Office, 1936. Full text viewability at HathiTrust Digital Library
 United States. Department of Agriculture. Miscellaneous Publication No. 197: The Hurricane by Ivan R. Tannehill, Principal Meteorologist, Weather Bureau. Washington DC: U.S. Govt. Printing Office, 1939. Ebook available at Google Books

Dissertations

External links
 Atlantic Oceanographic and Meteorological Laboratory
 Excerpts from the Labor Day 1935 Hurricane Monthly Weather Review Article
 Images of historic Florida Hurricanes (State Archives of Florida)
 Keys Historeum, Historical Preservation Society of the Upper Keys
 Florida Keys Memorial
 Florida Hurricane History
 FERA Overall Hurricane Damage Report
1935 Census of Civilian Victims/survivors of 1935 Hurricane
1935 Newspaper reports
Horrific Florida Keys Hurricane, Labor Day 1935 Biot Report #631: July 05, 2009

Labour Day
Category 5 Atlantic hurricanes
L (1935)
L (1935)
L (1935)
Labor Day hurricane, 1935
Labor Day hurricane, 1935
L (1935)
Labor Day hurricane
August 1935 events
September 1935 events